This is a list of members of the Camorra, a Mafia-type organisation in Naples and Campania in Italy.

A
 Enrico Alfano
 Carmine Alfieri
 Raffaele Amato
 Umberto Ammaturo

B
 Luigi Baccante
 Antonio Bardellino
 Pasquale Barra
 Domenico Bidognetti
 Francesco Bidognetti
 Patrizio Bosti

C
 Ciccio Cappuccio
 Vincenzo Casillo
 Mario Caterino
Ferdinando Cesarano
 Renato Cinquegranella
 Edoardo Contini
 Raffaele Cutolo
 Rosetta Cutolo

D
 Pasquale D'Amico
 Salvatore De Crescenzo
 Giuseppe Dell'Aquila
 Cosimo Di Lauro
 Marco Di Lauro
 Paolo Di Lauro
 Raffaele Diana
 Dinis Mariano
 Paolo Di Mauro

E
 Luigi Esposito

F
 Mario Fabbrocino

G
 Ketty Gabriele
 Pasquale Galasso
 Erminia Giuliano
 Luigi Giuliano

I
 Mario Umberto Imparato
 Antonio Iovine

L
 Antonio La Torre 
 Augusto La Torre
 Gennaro Licciardi
 Maria Licciardi
 Vincenzo Licciardi
 Salvatore Lo Russo

M
 Francesco Mallardo
 Pupetta Maresca
 Francesco Matrone
Ciro Mazzarella
 Gennaro Mazzarella
 Giuseppe Misso

N
 Lorenzo Nuvoletta

P
 Cesare Pagano
 Nicola Panaro
 Giovanni Pandico
 Giuseppe Polverino
 Giuseppe Puca

R
 Luigi Riccio
 Alfonso Rosanova
 Pasquale Russo
 Salvatore Russo

S
 Carmine Schiavone
 Francesco Schiavone "Sandokan"
 Francesco Schiavone "Cicciariello"
 Pasquale Scotti
 Marzio Sepe
 Giuseppe Setola
 Pasquale Simonetti
 Antonio Spavone
 Raffaele Stolder

V
 Luigi Vollaro

Z
 Michele Zagaria
 Michele Zaza

References

 
Camorra
Camorra
Camorra